2010 Olympics torch relay may refer to:
 2010 Winter Olympics torch relay, part of the 2010 Winter Olympics held in Vancouver, British Columbia, Canada
 2010 Winter Olympics torch relay route, the route taken by the torch relay
 2010 Summer Youth Olympics torch relay, part of the 2010 Summer Youth Olympics held in Singapore